The  West of Ireland Seniors Championship was a men's senior (over 50) professional golf tournament on the European Seniors Tour, held at the East Clare Golf Club in Bodyke, County Clare, Ireland. It was held just once, in August 1998, and was won by John Morgan who finished a shot ahead of Denis O'Sullivan.

Winners

References

External links
Coverage on the European Senior Tour's official site

Former European Senior Tour events
Golf tournaments in the Republic of Ireland
Golf in Munster
Sport in County Clare